The episodes of the Japanese anime series Inuyasha are based on the first 36 volumes for Rumiko Takahashi's manga series of the same name. It follows a half-demon Inuyasha and a high school girl Kagome Higurashi on a journey, alongside their friends, a young fox demon, Shippo; a lecherous monk, Miroku; a demon slayer, Sango; and a demon cat, Kirara, to obtain the fragments of the shattered Jewel of Four Souls, a powerful jewel that had been hidden inside Kagome's body, and keep the shards from being used for evil, including by the half-demon Naraku.

Produced by Sunrise, the series aired in Japan on ytv from October 16, 2000, to September 13, 2004. It also aired on Animax's English-language networks in South Asia and East Asia. The English dub of the series aired on Cartoon Network's nighttime programming block Adult Swim from August 31, 2002, to October 27, 2006. In Canada, the series aired on YTV.

A second anime series, Inuyasha: The Final Act, premiered on October 3, 2009, and covers the final volumes of the manga series.

Series overview

Episode list

Season 1 (2000–01)
From ep. 1 until episode 27

Season 2 (2001)
From ep. 28 until episode 54

Season 3 (2001–02)
From ep. 55 until episode 82

Season 4 (2002–03)
From ep. 83 until 110

Season 5 (2003–04)
From ep. 111 until 138

Season 6 (2004)
From ep. 139 until 167

Season 7: The Final Act (2009–10)
From ep. 168 until 193

Home media

DVD releases
On April 16, 2007, the first twelve Inuyasha episodes were released on DVD in the United Kingdom. In the United States, all of the seasons have been released as individual discs and, as of April 2009, season box sets.

Blu-ray releases

Music listing
Fourteen pieces of theme music were used for the original series; six opening themes and eight ending themes.

Notes

References